Timothy "Tim" Howard Timmons (born February 9, 1976) is an American musician, who sings contemporary worship and contemporary Christian music, and is currently signed to Reunion Records. His debut studio album Cast My Cares was released on June 4, 2013, and Paul Mabury produced the album. The lead single from that album released on March 22, 2013, and it has reached No. 21 on the Christian Songs chart.

Background
Timmons was born on February 9, 1976. Timmons is married to Hilary Beth Timmons, whose birth name is Hilary Beth Larson, and they have four children together, who are Malia, Noah, and twins Aaron and Anna. Timmons’ home church is The Following Church in Laguna Hills, California. Doctors told him he had five years left to live after a cancer diagnosis was made in June 2001.

Music
Timmons was signed to Reunion Records in 2013. His first studio album was produced by Paul Mabury, and is entitled Cast My Cares, which was released on June 4, 2013.

Discography

Studio albums

Singles

References

External links 
 

1976 births
Living people
People from Irvine, California
Christian music songwriters
Reunion Records artists